The men's team épée took place on November 13 at the Grand Palais, it was the last event of the championship.

Teams
34 teams competed.

Results

References

2010 World Fencing Championships